James Connor may refer to:

James Connor (footballer) (1861–1899), Scottish footballer
James M. Connor (born 1960), American actor
James Phillip Connor (1919–1994), US soldier awarded the Medal of Honor during World War II
James Connor (equestrian) (born 1959), Irish horse rider
James Connor (diver) (born 1995), Australian diver
James E. Connor, American political aide for Gerald Ford

See also
Jimmy Connor (disambiguation)
James Conner (disambiguation)
James Connors (disambiguation)
James O'Connor (disambiguation)
Connor James (disambiguation)